Kjelfossen is one of the highest waterfalls in Norway. The falls are located near the village of Gudvangen in Aurland Municipality in Vestland county. The height of the waterfall has never been accurately measured, so there are discrepancies in its actual height.

There are six drops in the falls. The largest of the three main drops (the one on the left) is officially named Kjelfossen, but is also known as Stor Kjelfossen. The middle falls is known as Vetle Kjelfoss, and the one on the right (and the smallest by volume) is thought to be unnamed. The falls are located just east of Gudvangen at the end of the Nærøyfjord. The falls can be seen from the European route E16 highway, just west of the entrance into the Gudvanga Tunnel.

Gallery

See also
List of waterfalls by height

References

External links

Aurland
Waterfalls of Vestland